Fan Chunhai (born March 1974) is a Chinese chemist and Chair Professor at the School of Chemistry and Chemical Engineering, Shanghai Jiaotong University.

Early life and education
Fan was born in Zhangjiagang, Jiangsu province in March 1974.
He received his a bachelor's degree and doctor's degree from Nanjing University in 1996 and 2000, respectively. He was a postdoc at the University of California, Santa Barbara under Alan J. Heeger.

Career
He returned to China in July 2000 and that same year became director of the Laboratory of Physical Biology, Shanghai Institute of Applied Physics, Chinese Academy of Sciences (CAS).

In April 2018 he joined the School of Chemistry and Chemical Engineering, Shanghai Jiaotong University as a Chair Professor.

In December 2017 he became a member of the 14th Central Committee of Jiusan Society.

Honours and awards
 Fellow of the American Association for the Advancement of Science (AAAS)
 Fellow of the International Society of Electrochemistry (ISE)
 Fellow of the Royal Society of Chemistry (RSC)
 November 18, 2019 Youth Innovation Award of the Ho Leung Ho Lee Foundation
 November 22, 2019 Member of the Chinese Academy of Sciences (CAS)
 2019 ACS Advances in Measurement Science Lectureship winners

References

External links
 Dr. Chunhai Fan, Professor  on the Chinese Academy of Sciences (CAS)

1974 births
People from Zhangjiagang
Living people
Nanjing University alumni
Chemists from Jiangsu
University of California, Santa Barbara alumni
Members of the Chinese Academy of Sciences
Fellows of the American Association for the Advancement of Science
Fellows of the Royal Society of Chemistry
Members of the Jiusan Society
Scientists from Suzhou